Panthoibi Iratpa or Panthoibi Iraat Thouni or Panthoibi Puja is a religious festival of the Manipuri people dedicated to goddess Panthoibi, the goddess of courage, war, bravery and wisdom of Sanamahism (Manipuri religion).  The festival falls on the same day of Hindu festival of Durga Puja. So, both the festival are celebrated together in Manipur.  The goddess Panthoibi is also worshipped as the goddess of same attributes (riding on the tiger) with that of Hindu goddess Durga since 1714 AD during the reign of Emperor Garib Niwaj when he embraced Hinduism as the official religion in the kingdom of Manipur.

The Hiyangthang Lairembi Temple in Imphal West district is the largest site for the festival in Manipur.

References

Festivals in India